Xiphorhynchus is a genus of birds in the woodcreeper subfamily (Dendrocolaptinae) that are found in Middle and South America.

Taxonomy
The genus Xiphorhynchus was introduced in 1827 by the English naturalist William John Swainson. The name combines the Ancient Greek xiphos meaning "sword" with rhunkhos meaning "bill". Swainson did not specify the type species but this was subsequently designated as the ivory-billed woodcreeper.

The genus contains the following 14 species:

The straight-billed woodcreeper and Zimmer's woodcreeper are now separated in Dendroplex.

References

External links

 
Bird genera
Taxonomy articles created by Polbot